Ridgeville is the name of several communities in the United States:
Ridgeville, Alabama
Ridgeville, Georgia
Ridgeville, Indiana
Ridgeville, Ohio (unincorporated)
Ridgeville, South Carolina
Ridgeville, Wisconsin, a town
Ridgeville (community), Wisconsin, an unincorporated community
Ridgeville Township, Illinois (former)
North Ridgeville, Ohio